Miss USA 2013 was the 62nd Miss USA pageant, held on June 16, 2013 at The AXIS in Las Vegas, Nevada.
The 50 states and the District of Columbia competed for the title and the pageant was televised live on NBC. Outgoing titleholder Nana Meriwether of Maryland crowned her successor Erin Brady of Connecticut at the end of the event. This was Connecticut's first ever Miss USA crown.

Viewers were able to interact with the pageant via Twitter and Zeebox.  Fans were able to vote for their favorite contestant through the Miss USA website, from May 15 to June 15. Jessica Billings, Miss Pennsylvania USA, winner of this fan vote won top 15 placement on the final night. Miss Texas USA, Alexandria Nugent, won the most Twitter votes among the top 10, winning her a place in the top 6.

Background

Selection of contestants
One delegate from each state and the District of Columbia was chosen in state pageants held which began in July 2012 and ended in January 2013. The first state pageant was Florida, held on July 14, 2012 as scheduled. The final pageants were Maine and Nevada, both held on January 27, 2013.

Ten delegates are former Miss Teen USA state winners, while two are former Miss America state winners and the other two are also former Miss America's Outstanding Teen state winners. Courtney Gifford became the first former Miss America's Outstanding Teen contestant winning the Miss USA state title.

Preliminary round
Prior to the final telecast, the delegates competed in the preliminary competition, which involves private interviews with the judges and a presentation show where they compete in swimsuit and evening gown. The preliminary competition took place on June 12, 2013, at 10 pm (ET) hosted by Chet Buchanan and Nana Meriwether, and was broadcast online on the official Miss USA website via stream.

Finals
During the final competition, the top fifteen competed in swimsuit, while the top ten competed evening gown, and the top six competed in the final question signed up by a panel of judges. The sixth finalist was determined by Twitter vote.

Results

Placements

 Voted into Top 15 via Internet 
§ Voted into Top 6 after the evening gown competition via Twitter

Special awards

Order of announcements

Top 15

Top 10

Top 6

Historical significance 
 Connecticut wins competition for the first time and surpasses its previous highest placement in 1966. Also becoming in the 32nd state who does it for the first time.
 Alabama earns the 1st runner-up position for the fourth time. The last time it placed this was in 2003.
 Illinois earns the 2nd runner-up position for the third time. The last time it placed this was in 1995.
 Utah earns the 3rd runner-up position for the third time. The last time it placed this was in 2009.
 Texas earns the 4th runner-up position for the third time. The last time it placed this was in 1975.
 South Carolina earns the first 5th runner-up position in the pageant's 61-year history.
 States that placed in semifinals the previous year were Alabama, Louisiana, Maryland, Nevada, Ohio, South Carolina and Texas. 
 Alabama placed for the fourth consecutive year.
 Maryland, South Carolina and Texas made their third consecutive placement.
 Louisiana, Nevada and Ohio made their second consecutive placement.
 California and Utah last placed in 2011.
 Pennsylvania last placed in 2010.
 Connecticut, North Carolina and West Virginia last placed in 2009.
 Massachusetts last placed in 2008.
 Illinois last placed in 2006.
 Georgia breaks an ongoing streak of placements since 2011.
 Maine breaks an ongoing streak of placements since 2010.
 Tennessee breaks an ongoing streak of placements since 2006.
 This is the second year in a row a state wins its first Miss USA title (Connecticut and Rhode Island), including Olivia Culpo's win in 2012.

Delegates
51 delegates have been confirmed.

Judges
Preliminary Judges: 
 Andrea Calvaruso
 Fred Nelson
 Kristin Boehm
 Kristin Prowty
 Lynne Diamante
 Nick Light
 Rob Goldstone

Telecast Judges:
 Bob Harper - trainer and star of The Biggest Loser
 Betsey Johnson - fashion designer
 NeNe Leakes - reality show star, actress
 Wendie Malick - star of Hot in Cleveland
 Jessica Robertson - star of reality show Duck Dynasty
 Larry Fitzgerald - Arizona Cardinals wide receiver
 Nikki Bella - WWE Diva wrestler
 Mo Rocca - TV/radio/blog political satirist

Background music
Opening Fashion Show – "Don't Stop the Party" by Pitbull featuring TJR, and "#thatPower" by will.i.am featuring Justin Bieber (background music)
Swimsuit Competition – "Pom Poms", "Neon" and "First Time" by Jonas Brothers (live performance)
Evening Gown Competition – "Sweet Nothing" (Extended Version) by Calvin Harris featuring  Florence Welch
Top 6 Final Look – "Back to Love" by Pauly D (live performance)

International broadcasters

Internet
: Xbox Live
: Xbox Live
: NBC.com, Xbox Live
Worldwide: Ustream

Television
Asia-Pacific: STAR World
: Indosiar, MNC International
: ABS-CBN, The Filipino Channel
: NBC
: Venevisión

Notes

References

External links 
 Miss USA official website 

2013
June 2013 events in the United States
2013 beauty pageants
2013 in Nevada
Zappos Theater